Andrew Murray Craven (born January 21, 1992) is an American soccer player.

Career

College and amateur
Craven began his college career at the College of Charleston. During his freshman year he lived in the McAlister dorm.  In his first season with the Cougars, he made 18 appearances and tallied four goals and one assist on his way to being named Southern Conference Freshman of the Year.  In 2011, he got off to a flying start.  Scoring six goals in his first eight matches before suffering a season-ending injury.  He still went on to be named All-Southern Conference Second Team.

In 2012, Craven transferred to the University of North Carolina.  In his first season with the Tar Heels, he made 22 appearances and tallied six goals and five assists.  In 2013, he redshirted his senior year after suffering a season-ending injury during preseason.  In his final year with the Tar Heels, he made 22 appearances and finished the year with 15 goals and 5 assists.

Craven also played in the Premier Development League for Chicago Fire U-23 and Orange County Blue Star.

Professional
On January 20, 2015, Craven was selected in the third round (47th overall) of the 2015 MLS SuperDraft by Seattle Sounders FC.  However, he was cut from camp and would eventually sign a professional contract with USL affiliate club Seattle Sounders FC 2.  He made his professional debut for the club and scored a goal in S2's 4–2 victory over Sacramento Republic FC. On June 27, 2015, Craven earned his chance to be promoted to Sounders FC First Team squad. Craven made his MLS debut for the Sounders the following day, replacing Chad Barrett in the 60th minute of the Sounders 4–1 defeat to the Portland Timbers.

Craven was acquired by FC Cincinnati in January 2017, but after only 3 appearances, he was traded to Oklahoma City Energy FC on May 10.

International
Craven was a member of the U.S. under-17 national team at the 2009 FIFA U-17 World Cup.

References

External links
North Carolina Tar Heels bio

1992 births
Living people
All-American men's college soccer players
American soccer players
Association football forwards
Chicago Fire U-23 players
College of Charleston Cougars men's soccer players
FC Cincinnati (2016–18) players
Major League Soccer players
North Carolina Tar Heels men's soccer players
OKC Energy FC players
Orange County Blue Star players
People from St. Simons, Georgia
Seattle Sounders FC draft picks
Seattle Sounders FC players
Tacoma Defiance players
Soccer players from Georgia (U.S. state)
United States men's youth international soccer players
USL League Two players
USL Championship players